East Macquarie, an electoral district of the Legislative Assembly in the Australian state of New South Wales was created in 1859 and abolished in 1894.


Election results

Elections in the 1890s

1892 by-election

1891

Elections in the 1880s

1889

1887

1885

1882

July 1882 by-election

January 1882 by-election

1880

Elections in the 1870s

1879 by-election

1878 by-election

1877

1875

1873 by-election

1872

Elections in the 1860s

1869

1867 by-election

1864

1864 by-election

1860

1860 by-election

Elections in the 1850s

1859 by-election

1859

Notes

References

New South Wales state electoral results by district